is a Japanese former football player.

Career
Furuta retired at the end of the 2019 season.

Club stats
Updated to 14 January 2020.

1Includes Emperor's Cup.
2Includes J. League Cup.

National team career
As of 4 October 2010

Appearances in major competitions

Honours
 Blaublitz Akita
 J3 League (1): 2017

References

External links
Profile at Blaublitz Akita
Profile at Consadole Sapporo 

1991 births
Living people
Association football people from Hokkaido
Japanese footballers
J1 League players
J2 League players
J3 League players
Hokkaido Consadole Sapporo players
Kamatamare Sanuki players
Zweigen Kanazawa players
Blaublitz Akita players
Association football midfielders
Sportspeople from Sapporo